George Curry (November 29, 1944 – April 1, 2016) was an American football coach, who was named twice as the USA Today High School Coach of the Year.

Biography
Curry coached high school football for forty-six years, during which time he amassed four hundred and fifty-five victories with six Pennsylvania Interscholastic Athletic Association Class 3A championships. All of his state championships came during a stretch in the 1980s and 1990s, as part of a thirty-nine-year stint at Berwick Area High School in Berwick, Pennsylvania. 

 Curry began his high school head coaching career in 1967 with a four-year winning record at Lake-Lehman School District in the Wyoming Valley Conference. He then moved on to Berwick Area in 1971, continuing there until he stepped down as head coach at Berwick in 2005.

During his time at Berwick, Curry won three national championships, and was twice named as the USA Today High School Coach of the Year.

He subsequently spent three seasons at Wyoming Valley West High School, and then retired in December 2008.

On June 11, 2012, local media (WNEP, WBRE and the Times-Leader) reported that Curry had been rehired to coach the Berwick Bulldogs on an interim basis, beginning with the fall 2012 season.

Death
Curry died on April 1, 2016, of ALS, which he had been diagnosed with the year prior.

References

1944 births
2016 deaths
High school football coaches in Pennsylvania
Sportspeople from Pennsylvania
Neurological disease deaths in Pennsylvania
Deaths from motor neuron disease